The 1903 Boston Americans season was the third season for the professional baseball franchise that later became known as the Boston Red Sox. The Americans finished first in the American League (AL) with a record of 91 wins and 47 losses,  games ahead of the Philadelphia Athletics. Boston went on to participate in the first World Series held between the AL and National League (NL) champions. The Americans won the 1903 World Series in eight games over the Pittsburgh Pirates. The team was managed by Jimmy Collins and played its home games at Huntington Avenue Grounds.

Regular season 
Prior to the regular season, the team held spring training in Macon, Georgia. Cy Young was a coach for the Mercer University baseball team, also based in Macon.
 April 20: The season opens with a home doubleheader against the Philadelphia Athletics, with Boston winning the first game, 9–4, and Philadelphia the second, 10–7.
 May 12: After a slow start to the season, the team has a winning record for the first time, at 10–9, with a 10–5 win over the Cleveland Naps at League Park in Cleveland.
 June 1: With a 20–15 record, Boston moves into first place in the AL, a half-game ahead of the St. Louis Browns.
 June 9: The team's longest winning streak of the season, 11 games between May 28 and June 8, comes to an end with a loss to the visiting Detroit Tigers.
 June 16: With a 28–18 record, Boston falls a game behind Philadelphia in the AL standings.
 June 21: Buck Freeman is the first player in franchise history to hit for the cycle, in a road win at Cleveland.
 June 23: With a 33–20 record, Boston regains the AL lead, which they will not relinquish through the end of the season.
 June 30: Nick Altrock starts and pitches eight innings in a 10–3 road loss to the Chicago White Sox; these are the only innings in the entire season not pitched by members of the five-man rotation, led by Cy Young.
 July 2: Altrock is sold to the White Sox; he starts against Boston on July 8, a 6–1 win by the Americans.
 July 29: Patsy Dougherty hits for the cycle against the visiting New York Highlanders. It is also Boston's highest scoring game of the year, a 15–14 loss.
 September 28: The season ends with a home doubleheader against the Browns, with Boston winning both games; 8–7 and 6–0.

The team's longest losing streak was three games, which occurred twice; April 20–23 and September 22–23. The team's longest game was 12 innings, which occurred three times.

Statistical leaders
The offense was led by Buck Freeman, who hit 13 home runs and had 104 RBIs, and Patsy Dougherty with a .331 batting average. It was Freeman's third consecutive season with at least 100 RBIs.
The pitching staff was led by Cy Young, who made 40 appearances (35 starts) and pitched 34 complete games with a 28–9 record and 2.08 ERA, while striking out 176 in  innings. The team had two other 20-game winners; Bill Dinneen (21–13) and Tom Hughes (20–7).

Season standings

The team had three games end in a tie; July 31 at Washington, August 29 at Washington, and September 25 vs. Detroit. Tie games are not counted in league standings, but player statistics during tie games are counted.

Record vs. opponents

Opening Day lineup

Source:

Roster

Player stats

Batting
Note: Pos = Position; G = Games played; AB = At bats; H = Hits; Avg. = Batting average; HR = Home runs; RBI = Runs batted in

Starters by position

Other batters
Note: G = Games played; AB = At bats; H = Hits; Avg. = Batting average; HR = Home runs; RBI = Runs batted in

Pitching
Note: G = Games pitched; IP = Innings pitched; W = Wins; L = Losses; ERA = Earned run average; SO = Strikeouts

Starting pitchers

World Series
Boston had an 11-game winning streak from May 28 through June 8, to put themselves in the AL lead. While they briefly fell into second place in mid-June, behind Philadelphia, Boston then won 9-of-10 to recapture the lead, which they held through the end of the season. The Americans met the Pittsburgh Pirates in the first modern World Series, an agreement between the AL and the NL as a post-season tournament. The "Amerks" won the best-of-nine series in eight games; after falling behind, 3–1, they won four games in a row, clinching the championship at their home field, the Huntington Avenue Grounds, in Boston.

The first championship of what is now 9 for the long-running club, the series would immortalized in the 2004 remake of the team's fight song Tessie by The Dropkick Murphys, honoring the victory over the Pirates in Game 5, helped in part by that song which was adopted as an anthem by the a group of team supporters, the Royal Rooters, under saloon owner Michael T. McGreevy.

Summary

See also
 List of Boston Red Sox team records

References

External links
1903 Boston Americans team page at Baseball Reference
1903 Boston Americans season at baseball-almanac.com

Boston Red Sox seasons
Boston Americans
Boston Americans
1900s in Boston
American League champion seasons
World Series champion seasons